Marysvale Canyon (sometimes referred to as Sevier Canyon)  is a canyon in Piute and Sevier counties in southwest Utah, United States which runs  north from just north of Marysvale north to the town of Sevier.

Description
The canyon is a steep walled canyon formed by the flow of the meandering Sevier River. The narrow canyon lies between Sargent Mountain on the northeast corner of the Tushar Mountains to the west and the margin of the small Antelope Range of Sevier County to the east. The canyon ends to the north at the intersection of the Sevier River with Clear Creek Canyon which forms the north margin of the Tushars.

Points of interest in the canyon are Big Rock Candy Mountain, old mining sites, and the rail tunnels along the old Marysvale Branch of the Denver and Rio Grande Western Railroad that has been converted to a hiking/biking path.

See also
 List of canyons and gorges in Utah

References

External links

 Official Website of Marysvale Utah
 Marysvale Canyon
 Rock Candy Express Bike Trail
 Sevier River
 Historic Mining Sites
 Canyon of Gold Tour

Canyons and gorges of Utah
Landforms of Piute County, Utah
Landforms of Sevier County, Utah
U.S. Route 89